3010 may refer to:

In general
 3010, a number in the 3000 (number) range
 A.D. 3010, a year of the 4th millennium CE
 3010 BC, a year in the 4th millennium BCE

Places
 3010 Ushakov, an asteroid in the Asteroid Belt, the 3010th asteroid registered
 Hawaii Route 3010, a state highway
 Farm to Market Road 3010, a Texas state highway

Ships with pennant 3010
 , a WWII Kriegsmarine submarine
 , a British Royal Navy WWII landing ship tank
 , a U.S. Navy cargo ship
 , a U.S. Navy WWI troopship

Other uses
 United Nations General Assembly Resolution 3010 (1972), resolution to make 1975 the International Women's Year
 Kawasaki MULE 3010, a utility task vehicle

See also

 
 A3010 (disambiguation)